François Müller (23 February 1927 – 17 September 1999) was a Luxembourgian footballer. He competed in the men's tournament at the 1952 Summer Olympics.

References

External links
 
 

1927 births
1999 deaths
Luxembourgian footballers
Luxembourg international footballers
Olympic footballers of Luxembourg
Footballers at the 1952 Summer Olympics
Sportspeople from Luxembourg City
Association football midfielders